Edward John Hinch  (born 4 March 1947) is a Professor of fluid dynamics at the University of Cambridge, and fellow of Trinity College, Cambridge.

His research covers a wide range of fluid dynamics, including micro-hydrodynamics, colloidal dispersion, flow through porous media, polymer rheology and non-Newtonian fluid dynamics. He also works on industrial problems involving fluid dynamics, including collaborating with experimental groups in Paris, Marseille and Toulouse. He lectures undergraduates at the University of Cambridge, is a Director of Studies for Trinity College, and supervises PhD students.

John Hinch has published more than a hundred papers on fluid dynamics. Since 1997 he has been a Fellow of the Royal Society and he is also a Knight of the Ordre National du Mérite of France and a Fellow of the American Physical Society. In 2012, Hinch was elected a member of the National Academy of Engineering for contributions to the mechanics of fluids, suspensions, and polymeric liquids and to industrial processes.

External links
 John Hinch's Cambridge Homepage
 John Hinch on the Mathematics Genealogy Project

1947 births
Living people
20th-century British mathematicians
21st-century British mathematicians
Rheologists
Alumni of Trinity College, Cambridge
Fellows of Trinity College, Cambridge
Fellows of the Royal Society
Cambridge mathematicians
Fluid dynamicists
Foreign associates of the National Academy of Engineering